Tschumi is a surname. Notable people with the surname include:

Bernard Tschumi (born 1944), Swiss architect, writer, and educator
Gabriel Tschumi (1883–1957), Swiss Master Chef to three British monarchs
Jean Tschumi (1904–1962), Swiss architect and professor
Otto Tschumi (1904–1985), Swiss painter
Regula Tschumi, Swiss social anthropologist and art historian